Caroline D. Pham is an American attorney who serves as a commissioner of the Commodity Futures Trading Commission.

Education 
Pham earned a Bachelor of Arts degree from the University of California, Los Angeles and a Juris Doctor from the George Washington University Law School.

Career 
From 2005 to 2008, Pham worked as an assistant at Sullivan & Cromwell. She was also a legal intern at the Commodity Futures Trading Commission, the Securities and Exchange Commission and a law clerk in the Office of the Comptroller of the Currency. She served as a judicial extern to former Chief Judge Loren A. Smith. From 2013 to 2014, she served as special counsel and policy advisor to CFTC Commissioner Scott D. O'Malia. Since 2014, she has worked in several positions at Citigroup.

In December 2021, President Joe Biden announced his intent to nominate Pham to be a commissioner of the Commodity Futures Trading Commission. Her nomination was confirmed by the United States Senate on March 28, 2022, and she was sworn in on April 14.

References 

Living people

Year of birth missing (living people)

American lawyers

University of California, Los Angeles alumni
George Washington University Law School alumni
Citigroup people
Commodity Futures Trading Commission personnel
Sullivan & Cromwell people